Changlang is a census town and headquarters of the Changlang district in the Indian state of Arunachal Pradesh. 
It has become one of the major districts in the area owing to the presence of crude oil, coal and mineral resources other than tourism and hydro power.

Changlang is located at the co-ordinates .

Etymology
According to legend the name Changlang owes its origin to the local word CHANGLANGKAN which means a hilltop where people discovered the poisonous herb, which is used for poisoning fish in the river.

Demographics
 India census, Changlang had a population of 6,394. Males constitute 56% of the population and females 44%. Changlang has an average literacy rate of 72%, higher than the national average of 59.5%; with male literacy of 78% and female literacy of 65%. 14% of the population is under 6 years of age.

Languages

According to Census 2011, Tangsa language is Spoken by 1,326, Nepali is Spoken by 823 people, Bengali at 677 people, Hindi by 605 people, Assamese at 577 and Bhojpuri at 357.

References

Additional Reading
 Rebels eye Arunachal alternative to Bhutan - Army sees possible Red Cross intervention in Himalayan kingdom as advantage to banned group

 
Cities and towns in Changlang district